The Particular Cowboys is a 1914 American silent comedy film featuring Oliver Hardy.

Plot

Cast
 Frances Ne Moyer as Muriel
 Raymond McKee as Jake
 Ben Walker as Bill
 Oliver Hardy as A Cowboy (as Babe Hardy)

See also
 List of American films of 1914
 Oliver Hardy filmography

External links

1914 films
American silent short films
American black-and-white films
1914 comedy films
1914 short films
Films directed by Arthur Hotaling
Silent American comedy films
American comedy short films
1910s American films